Henning L. Larsen (born 12 April 1955) is a retired Danish track cyclist. He competed at the 1984 Summer Olympics in the 4 km individual pursuit and finished in 18th place.

References

1955 births
Living people
Danish male cyclists
Olympic cyclists of Denmark
Cyclists at the 1984 Summer Olympics
Sportspeople from Odense